Arnbruck is a municipality in the district of Regen, in Bavaria, Germany.

References

Regen (district)